Sarasbaug is a major landmark in the city of Pune in India. The place where the park now stands was once occupied by a small lake. However, the lake dried up and was later developed into Sarasbaug. The whole  complex is known as Sarasbaug. The Ganesh temple in Saras Baug is also known as Talyatla Ganapati (in Marathi:तळ्यातला गणपती ) which translates as the Ganapati of the lake.

History

The Construction of the Temple started in 1750 under the direction of Naansaheb
Peshwe, the de facto head of the Maratha confederacy. The construction of the temple was completed in 1784 with the idol of Hindu Lord Ganesh in the temple. The temple was built in the lake near the Parvati Temple, which was also the primary residence of the Peshwa family. The inscription in the temple reads: 
|| देवदेवेश्वर सुतं देवं | सारासोद्यान भूषणं ||
|| कल्पद्रुमां त्वां भक्तानां | वन्दे सिद्धीविनायकं ||

The temple was also used for military strategy discussions by the Marathas against the Nizam and the British Empire in the 18th & 19th century as it was situated away from the Parvati Temple. Earlier the garden was not in place and there was a lake and a small temple at the center. The temple used to be called as "Talyatla Ganapati" (Ganesh temple in the lake). The Peshwa, his commander, and the advisors would go in the lake by boat to discuss the issue and plans. It is also recorded that the boats were steered by non-natives like Africans for complete secrecy, as they did not understand the local Marathi language.

The temple and the area surrounding it were renovated several times in the last 2 centuries. One of the renovations was carried out in 1842 with the help of the East India Company of the British empire.

The last major renovation took place in 1969 under the direction of Mahadev Kumthekar and Anandrao Mane. As part of the last renovation a zoo called Peshwe Park was added to this  area. Then, starting in 1999 and ending in 2005, the animals at the zoo were all moved to the Rajiv Gandhi Zoological Park situated in the south of the city. This garden and temple are one of the primary landmarks of Pune.

In 1995, a small museum, displaying over a few hundred idols of Lord Ganesha, was added to the temple premises.

Location

The temple was constructed at the foot of Parvati hill. 

Sarasbaug is located within a km from Swargate Bus Station which is a ground transport station for Pune and around 6 km from Pune Railway Station.

See also
Baug

References

External links

Hindu temples in Maharashtra
Tourist attractions in Pune
Parks in Pune
1784 establishments in British India